Norashen is a village in the Berd Municipality of the Tavush Province of Armenia. There is a museum in the village, as well as a cyclopean fort close by.

Gallery

References

External links 

Kiesling, Rediscovering Armenia, p. 113, available online at the US embassy to Armenia's website

Populated places in Tavush Province